Philip Douglas Beidler (October 29, 1944 – April 20, 2022) was a professor of American literature at the University of Alabama, and the author and editor of books on Alabama literature, the Vietnam War, and other topics. For his work on Vietnam writers, he has been called "one of the founding fathers of Vietnam War studies."

Biography
Beidler, who was of German and Quaker descent, was born October 29, 1944, in Adams, Pennsylvania. He did his undergraduate studies at Davidson College. During 1969 and 1970, he served as a lieutenant in an armored cavalry platoon in Vietnam. He received master's and doctoral degrees in English from the University of Virginiathe latter in 1974.

He became a professor at the University of Alabama in the mid-1970s, served as director of graduate studies and as assistant dean, and was awarded the 1999 Burnum Distinguished Faculty Award. He was eventually named the Margaret and William Going Professor of English and, at the time of his death, he was a professor emeritus of English at the University of Alabama. 

Beidler suffered from Parkinson's during the last years of his life. He died April 20, 2022.

Selected publications

Vietnam literature

Alabama literature

References

External links
Philip Beidler, professor emeritus, the University of Alabama English Department
An interview with Beidler on Alabama Public Television

1944 births
2022 deaths
United States Army personnel of the Vietnam War
American people of German descent
American male writers
Davidson College alumni
Military personnel from Pennsylvania
People from Armstrong County, Pennsylvania
University of Alabama faculty
University of Virginia alumni
Writers from Pennsylvania